This is a list of current and past vehicles and other products from Mack Trucks.

Cabovers
G series
D series
N series
W series
A series
H series
F series
WR - Cruise-Liner series
MH - Ultra-Liner series
MS - Mid-Liner series
MB series
MC / MR series
 TERRAPRO chassis MRU/LEU series

ConventionalL Series
B seriesC seriesCH seriesCL seriesCT seriesCV seriesCX seriesD seriesE series
R series
DM series
U series
RW / Super-Liner seriesCHN seriesCXN seriesCXP seriesCHU seriesCXU seriesGU  series
Titan

Australian production models
Conventional:Metro-Liner/Metro-Liner 8x4TridentTitan
Super-Liner and Super-Liner LT (Cat & Cummins engines available)
Valueliner
Fleet-Liner
Granite (as of 2008)
Cabovers:
Qantum
Premium
New Zealand only model: RB

Specialty equipment
FD - Front discharge Mixer chassis
HMM - All wheel drive half cab mixer chassis

Off-Highway
AP Series- 1930-1938
FSCW Series- 1937-1938
NW Model- 1941
M series- 1960-1967
 Bigfoot (Australia) 1996-2006

Fire apparatus
C Series- 1957-1967
CF Series- 1967-1990

Military trucks

NJ (G639)- 5-6 ton 4x2 COE 1941-1942
NM (G535)- 6 ton 6x6 1940-1943
NO (G532)- 7 1/2 ton 6x6 1943
NR (G528)- 10 ton 6x4 1940-1945
M52/54A1 (G744)- 5 ton 6x6 1962-1963 Re-powered with ENDT673
M123/125 (G792)- 10 ton 6x6 1955-1958 Developed from NO

Rail equipment
ACR/ACX Series- 1916-1938 (with Brill bodies)
FCD Model- 1954

Early and pre-World War II truck and buses

"Old # 1"- Bus 1900
Manhattan Series- 1903
Junior Series- 1909
AB Series- 1914-1920
AC Series- 1916-1939
AK Series- 1928-193?, 3½–5 ton high speed carrier
AP Series- 1926-1938
Junior (II) Series- 1936-1938
E Series- 1936-1951
F Series- 1936-1942
L Series- 1940-1948

See also
 Mack Trucks

References

External links
 Mack Trucks Inc. Official website
 Mack Trucks Australia Official website
 BigMackTrucks.com - Antique & Classic Truck Forum

Truck-related lists